Life Begins at Eight (German: Das Leben beginnt um acht) is a 1962 West German drama film directed by Michael Kehlmann and starring O.E. Hasse, Johanna Matz and Helmut Wildt. It is an adaptation of the 1940 play The Light of Heart by Emlyn Williams, previously adapted into a 1942 Hollywood film Life Begins at Eight-Thirty. The action is moved from the play's setting of London to Berlin.

The film's sets were designed by the art directors Hans Berthel and Johannes Ott. Completed in late 1961, it premiered at the Marmorhaus in Berlin early in the New Year.

Synopsis
A former stage star, struggling with the decline of his career and a drinking problem, lives with his daughter Cattrin. A young composer falls in love with her and manages to secure her father some work. However his demons ultimately overwhelm him and he commits suicide, freeing his daughter to live her own life.

Cast
 O.E. Hasse as Mac Thomas 
 Johanna Matz as Cattrin, seine Tochter 
 Helmut Wildt as Robert Hauser 
 Gudrun Thielemann as Fanny Ehrenwirth 
 Gundel Thormann as Emily Lawrence 
 Walter Buschhoff as Willibald Barthels 
 Eva Crüwell as Susanne Wenk 
 Fritz Rémond Jr. as Frenkel, Manager 
 Hans Schwarz Jr. as Charly 
 Erna Sellmer as Frau Banner 
 Walter Tarrach as Dr. Stadtländer 
 Gerd Vespermann as Gerber, Garderobier 
 Stefan Wigger as Eberhard Bezel, Polizist 
 Lissy Arna
 Ursula Diestel
 Edith Elsholtz
 Hans Epskamp
 Richard Handwerk
 Harald Holberg
 Günther Stopnik
 Max Strassberg
 Achim Strietzel
 Egon Vogel
 Lilo Zabke

References

Bibliography 
 Bock, Hans-Michael & Bergfelder, Tim. The Concise CineGraph. Encyclopedia of German Cinema. Berghahn Books, 2009.
 Goble, Alan. The Complete Index to Literary Sources in Film. Walter de Gruyter, 1999.

External links 
 

1962 films
West German films
German drama films
1962 drama films
1960s German-language films
Films directed by Michael Kehlmann
Films set in Berlin
Films about actors
German films based on plays
Remakes of American films
UFA GmbH films
1960s German films